Coleridge Gardner Tillman (born January 17, 1989), who goes by the stage name Sebastian Kole, is an American singer-songwriter and record producer from Birmingham, Alabama. He is currently signed to EP Entertainment and Motown Records. Prior to his work with Motown, Sebastian was known for co-writing on a Jennifer Lopez and Flo Rida single titled "Goin' In". Since signing with EP Entertainment/Motown in 2012, Sebastian worked with label-mate Alessia Cara, co-writing and co-producing her album, including her debut single "Here" (along with Grammy-winning producers Andrew "Pop" Wansel and Oak).

Early life
Sebastian Kole was born Coleridge Gardner Tillman, on January 17, 1989, in Birmingham, Alabama. He learned music through church, where he began singing in choral and playing doctor at the age of 5. At age 13 he began to delve into a rap career and writing his own songs, which evolved into a singing career once he started college.

Career
Kole would play at various bars and clubs while attending the University of Alabama where he eventually graduated as a Music Tech major. Upon his graduation, Sebastian moved back home and continued to work on his writing. In early 2012, he co-wrote a Jennifer Lopez and Flo Rida collaboration titled "Goin' In". This placement prompted him to move to LA where he signed with EP Entertainment and Motown in December 2012.

In 2014, Sebastian began working with EP Entertainment labelmate Alessia Cara, who released her debut single on Def Jam in April 2015. Sebastian co-wrote and co-produced her debut album along with Pop & Oak Kuya and Malay. The song debuted on The Fader and accumulated over 500,000 streams in its first week. Kole has also worked on music for the TV series Grey's Anatomy.

His debut album, Soup, was released on October 7, 2016. It was preceded by a self-titled EP in May and three singles released across March and April: "Home", "Love's On the Way" and "Love Doctor".

Discography

Studio albums

Extended plays

Singles

Songwriting and production credits

References

External links
 EP Entertainment official website

Living people
1979 births
African-American male singer-songwriters
Motown artists
21st-century African-American male singers